Tanquary Fiord is a fjord on the north coast of the Arctic Archipelago's Ellesmere Island, Nunavut, Canada. It is located in the Quttinirpaaq National Park and extends  in a north-westerly direction from Greely Fiord.

History 
Radiocarbon dating methods suggest that between 10,000 and 4,100 BP, deglaciation occurred, followed by a period of glacial readvance and the formation of ice shelves until 2,400 BP. Until 1,400 BP, a period of glacial retreat occurred, and since then glacial readvance and nearby ice rises have marked the area.

Radiocarbon analysis of charcoal undertaken by the Geological Survey of Canada has shown that Inuit were present at Tanquary Fiord around 1070 BP at the latest.

Geography 
The head of the Tanquary Fiord is the convergence point of four river valleys, three of which end in a floodplain and one in a river delta. Carbon dating findings show that the fjord was free of glacial ice approximately 6,500 years ago. In the past 40 years, the terminal points of side glaciers have receded.

Tanquary Fiord has 65 frost-free days per year (enough to grow lettuce), which is remarkable for its latitude. Summer temperatures of  have been recorded.

Human activity 
In 1963, the Defence Research Board began 'Operation Tanquary' in the area, with a focus on oceanography. The operation concluded in 1972. As the fjord is in a remote location, there is little human habitation. A Warden Station is staffed by Parks Canada during the summer months, and Tanquary Fiord Airport is located nearby. It is possible to reach the area via charter aircraft, or increasingly, via icebreaker cruise ships. The Fiord was named by Explorer Donald Baxter MacMillan in honor of his friend and fellow explorer Maurice Cole Tanquary. See also the Crocker Land Expedition.

References 

Ellesmere Island
Bodies of water of Baffin Bay
Fjords of Qikiqtaaluk Region